Alexander Grant Webster (12 December 1933 – 8 November 1994) was a South African boxer. He competed at the 1952 Summer Olympics and the 1956 Summer Olympics. At the 1956 Summer Olympics, he lost to John McCormack of Great Britain.

References

1933 births
1994 deaths
South African male boxers
Olympic boxers of South Africa
Boxers at the 1952 Summer Olympics
Boxers at the 1956 Summer Olympics
Boxers from Johannesburg
Commonwealth Games medallists in boxing
Commonwealth Games gold medallists for South Africa
Boxers at the 1958 British Empire and Commonwealth Games
Light-middleweight boxers
Medallists at the 1958 British Empire and Commonwealth Games